Villages and settlements in Namibia are distinguished by the status the  Government of Namibia has vested in them: Places in Namibia that are governed by a village council are villages, they are the smallest entities of local government. All other places except cities and towns are not self-governed, they are called settlements.

Villages 
 Namibia has 18 villages, each of them governed by a village council of up to five seats. Village councils are elected locally and have the authority to set up facilities like water, sewerage and cemeteries without the approval of the Minister of Urban and Rural Development. They may also declare streets and public places, collect fees for the services they provide, and buy immovable property without asking for explicit approval. The eighteen villages are:

Settlements 

Settlements in Namibia are non self-governed populated places. While they may have a dedicated person responsible for their administration, this person is not elected but an employee of the respective regional administration. Some of the settlements in Namibia per Region are:

Kunene Region

 Fransfontein
 Ohamaremba, Epupa Constituency
 Okangwati, Epupa Constituency
 Otjomuru, Epupa Constituency
 Ovinjange
 Sesfontein

Omusati Region

 Anamulenge
 Elim
 Nakayale
 Ogongo
 Okakundu
 Okalongo
 Olupandu
 Ompakoya
 Omugulugwombashe
 Onawa
 Ongandjera
 Onhokolo
 Otindi

Oshana Region

 Eheke, administrative centre of the Ondangwa Rural constituency.
 Ekuku
 Oikango
 Okamule
 Omagongati
 Omashekediva
 Oniimwandi
 Otshaandja
 Uuvudhiya

Ohangwena Region

 Edundja
 Ekango Lomuve
 Epinga
 Epuku
 Etomba
 Okongo
 Oshikango
 Odibo, archdeaconry in northern Namibia
 Onghala
 Okanghudi
 Okatana, administrative centre of Okatana Constituency
 Okauva
 Omungwelume
 Omutwewomunu, administrative centre of Oshikunde Constituency
 Onamunhama
 Onandova
 Ondeihaluka
 Ondeikela
 Ondobe Yomunghudi
 Onekwaya West
 Ongha
 Oshakati
 Oshandi
 Oshindobe

Oshikoto Region

 Iihongo
 King Kauluma Village
 Okambonde
 Okoloti, administrative centre of Nehale lyaMpingana Constituency
 Olukonda
 Omakango, Okankolo constituency
 Omhuuda 
 Omunduta 
 Omutwewomedi
 Onamungundo
 Onayena, district capital of the Onayena Constituency
 Oniiwe
 Onkumbula
 Oshigambo
 Oshivelo
 Tsintsabis
 Uuyoka
Amilema

Kavango West Region

 Bunya
 Kahenge
 Mburuuru, administrative centre of Tondoro Constituency
 Mpungu
 Ncamangoro, administrative centre of Ncamangoro Constituency
 Rupara
 Tondoro

Kavango East Region

 Andara
 Bagani
 Diyogha
 Kaisosi
 Kangongo
 Mashare
 Mupini
 Ndonga Linena, administrative centre of Ndonga Linena Constituency
 Nyangana
 Shinyungwe

Zambezi Region

 Chinchimane
 Ibbu
 Kongola
 Lisikili
 Luhonono
 Nakabolelwa, administrative centre of Kabbe South
 Ngoma
 Sangwali, administrative centre of Tondoro Constituency
 Sibbinda

Erongo Region

 Dolfynstrand
 Langstrand
 Okombahe
 Omatjette
 Otjimbingwe
 Uis
 Utuseb
 Wlotzkasbaken

Otjozondjupa Region

 Abenab
 Hochfeld
 Kalkfeld
 Kombat
 Okamatapati
 Osire
 Tsumkwe
 Vyf Rand

Omaheke Region

 Aminuis
 Buitepos
 Donkerbos
 Drimiopsis
 Eiseb
 Epukiro
 Ezorongondo
 Okazapamba
 Omitara
 Onderombapa
 Ovituua
 Sonneblom
 Talismanus
 Tsjaka

Khomas Region

 Baumgartsbrunn
 Brakwater
 Döbra
 Dordabis
 Mix camp
 Neudamm
 Seeis
 Solitaire

Hardap Region

 Groot Aub
 Hoachanas
 Khauxas
 Klein Aub
 Uibis
 Rietoog
 Schlip

ǁKaras Region

 Ariamsvlei
 Asab
 Aus
 Aussenkehr - in the process of gaining town status
 Blouwes, north-east of Keetmanshoop
 Grünau
 Helmeringhausen
 Kosis
 Narubis
 Noordoewer
 Rosh Pinah
 Seeheim
 Snyfontein
 Warmbad

See also 

 List of cities and towns in Namibia
 Geography of Namibia
 Regions of Namibia

References

Notes

Literature

Further reading

 Commonwealth Local Government Forum Country Profile: Namibia
 City of Windhoek Cooperations and Partnerships

Populated places in Namibia
Villages
Namibia